Robert Romanus (born July 17, 1956), also billed as Bob Romanus, is an American actor and musician who has starred in film and television. He is perhaps best known for his role as ticket scalper Mike Damone in the 1982 comedy Fast Times at Ridgemont High, and as Natalie Green's boyfriend Snake on The Facts of Life. He also had a supporting role in the 1985 film Bad Medicine.

Life and career
Romanus is the son of Eileen (née Maloof) and Dr. Raymond Romanos, and is the brother of actor Richard Romanus. He grew up in West Hartford, Connecticut, and went to Conard High School. He is of Lebanese descent.

He starred in the 1983 series The Best of Times as Pete Falcone and appeared in Fame as Miltie Horowitz (1986–1987).

In 1983, he appeared in Styx's music video for Kilroy Was Here.

Romanus has starred on soap operas such as Days of Our Lives as Marvin 'Speed' Selejko from 1983 to 1985 and The Young and the Restless as Lou in 2002. He has guest-starred on many shows, including CHiPs, The Facts of Life, 21 Jump Street, Alien Nation, MacGyver, Providence, Will & Grace, and My Own Worst Enemy. Romanus directed the 2008 drama Grapefruit Moon and had a small part in American Pie Presents: The Book of Love as himself. In 2010, he played the guitar teacher in The Runaways. His 2018 projects include the films Genesis: The Future of Mankind Is Woman, The Liquid Psychologist and Voyeur.

Personal life
Romanus once owned a café in North Hollywood, Bob's Espresso Bar, which closed in 2014.

Filmography

Film

Television

Music videos

References

External links 

1956 births
20th-century American actors
Living people
American male film actors
American male television actors
American people of Arab descent
American people of Lebanese descent
Place of birth missing (living people)
American male soap opera actors
American male musicians